Loyd is an unincorporated community in Calhoun County, Mississippi, United States. A post office operated under the name Loyd from 1884 to 1909.

Notes

Unincorporated communities in Calhoun County, Mississippi
Unincorporated communities in Mississippi